Maura "Soshin" O'Halloran (May 24, 1955 - October 22, 1982) was an Irish Zen Buddhist monk. She is known for her book Pure Heart, Enlightened Mind, which was posthumously published, and for being one of the "first of few Western women allowed to practice in a traditional Japanese Zen monastery".

Biography
O'Halloran was born in Boston, Massachusetts in 1955 and her parents moved back to Ireland when she was four years old. There she was educated in a convent school in County Dublin and later attended Trinity College Dublin, where she graduated with a joint degree in mathematical economics/statistics and sociology. Shortly after her graduation O'Halloran traveled to northern Japan, where she studied to become a Zen monk at Toshoji in Tokyo and at Kannonji in the Iwate Prefecture.

On November 18, 1979, O'Halloran contacted and went to the Toshoji Temple where she met the master at the time, Tetsugyu Soin Ban, who she respected with the honorific title "Go-Roshi." On November 23, 1979, she was given the Buddhist name of "Soshin", meaning something like "Genuine Heart/Mind". After a three-year period, on August 8, 1982, she decided to travel back to Ireland. O'Halloran died in a traffic accident in Chiang Mai, Thailand on October 22, 1982. After her death she was titled "Great Enlightened Lady, of the same heart and mind as the Great Teacher Buddha" and a statue was dedicated to her at the temple she studied at in Iwate Prefecture.

Bibliography
Pure Heart, Enlightened Mind: The Zen Journal and Letters of Maura "Soshin" O'Halloran. Charles E. Tuttle Company, Boston, 1994. .

References

External links
Pure Heart Enlightened Mind - The Zen Journal and Letters of Maura "Soshin" O'Halloran, Sarah Fremerman
Photos of Maura from Tenku's Flickr page

1955 births
1982 deaths
American Zen Buddhists
American people of Irish descent
Buddhist nuns
American emigrants to Ireland
20th-century Buddhist nuns